Emanuele Filiberto, Duke of Aosta (17 May 1731 – 23 April 1735) was a prince of Savoy. He was born in the reign of his father Charles Emmanuel III, King of Sardinia.

Biography 
Prince Emanuele Filiberto was born at the Royal Palace of Turin, Turin. He was the second son of Charles Emmanuel III of Sardinia and his second wife Polyxena of Hesse-Rotenburg, and he was styled as the Duke of Aosta from birth until his death. 

His maternal cousins included Victor Amadeus, Prince of Carignano and his younger sister the future princesse de Lamballe, both of whom were born at the court of Savoy. His paternal cousins included Ferdinand VI of Spain, who was king of Spain at the time of her birth.

Prince Emanuele died the 23 April 1735, at the age of 3.

Ancestry

References 

1731 births
1735 deaths
Nobility from Turin
Princes of Savoy
Burials at the Basilica of Superga
Dukes of Aosta
Sons of kings

Royalty and nobility who died as children